Dulce Margarita García Gil (July 2, 1968 in Delicias, Puerto Padre in Las Tunas – September 9, 2019) was a Cuban javelin thrower, who represented her native country at the 1992 Summer Olympics. She set her personal best (67.90 metres) in 1986.

Achievements

References

External links

1968 births
2019 deaths
Cuban female javelin throwers
Athletes (track and field) at the 1991 Pan American Games
Athletes (track and field) at the 1992 Summer Olympics
Olympic athletes of Cuba
Pan American Games medalists in athletics (track and field)
Pan American Games gold medalists for Cuba
World Athletics Championships athletes for Cuba
Medalists at the 1991 Pan American Games
People from Puerto Padre
20th-century Cuban women
20th-century Cuban people